Johann Rafelski (born 19 May 1950) is a German-American theoretical physicist. He is professor of Physics at The University of Arizona in Tucson, guest scientist at CERN (Geneva),  and has been LMU-Excellent Guest Professor at the Ludwig Maximilian University of Munich in Munich, Germany.

Rafelski's current research interests center around investigation of the vacuum structure of QCD and QED in the presence of strong fields;  study of the QCD vacuum structure and deconfinement with strange particle production in deconfined quark–gluon plasma formed in relativistic heavy ion collisions; the formation of matter out of quark–gluon plasma in the hadronization process, also in the early Universe; considering antimatter formation and annihilation. He has also contributed to the physics of table top muon-catalyzed fusion and the ascent of ultrashort laser light pulses as a new tool in this domain of physics. He contributed to understanding of neural nets and artificial intelligence showing importance of neural plasticity and "sleep".

Career
Rafelski studied physics at Johann Wolfgang Goethe University in Frankfurt, Germany, where he received his PhD in the spring of 1973 working with Walter Greiner on strong fields and muonic atom tests of QED. In 1973 he began a series of postdoctoral fellowships: first at the University of Pennsylvania (Philadelphia) with Abraham Klein, then at the Argonne National Laboratory near Chicago where he worked with John W. Clark of Washington University in St. Louis and Michael Danos of National Bureau of Standards (now National Institute of Standards and Technology (NIST)). In spring 1977 Rafelski moved for a few months to work at the GSI Helmholtz Centre for Heavy Ion Research in Germany, then continued on to a fellowship at CERN, where he worked with Rolf Hagedorn and John S. Bell; Rafelski remains associated with CERN to this day. In the fall of 1979 Rafelski was appointed tenured associate professor at Johann Wolfgang Goethe University where he taught for 4 years, while collaborating closely with Hagedorn and with Berndt Müller and Gerhard Soff, whom Rafelski mentored in his PhD work. Rafelski then accepted the chair of Theoretical Physics at the University of Cape Town (South Africa) where he created a Theoretical Physics and Astrophysics Institute before moving to The University of Arizona in the fall of 1987. During these years he was also a guest scientist at NIST in Washington, D.C.  His interests in muon-catalyzed fusion  and other table-top fusion methods led him to a collaboration led by Steven E. Jones working at the Los Alamos National Laboratory. The start-up of experimental work on quark–gluon plasma has led to another enduring collaboration with the University of Paris 7-Jussieu involving Jean Letessier.

Rafelski has been instrumental to the study of quark–gluon plasma (QGP) advancing strangeness production as the pivotal QGP signature, for which the first experimental evidence was announced by CERN in February 2000, and now has become a new field of physics. This work relates to his long-lasting studies of the structured quantum vacuum, also known as Lorentz Invariant Aether.

Melting Hadrons, Boiling Quarks 
Melting Hadrons, Boiling Quarks  is a scientific book series edited by Rafelski. The first volume of 2016 published as open-access under the Creative Commons license 4.0. is subtitled 'From Hagedorn Temperature to ultra-relativistic heavy-ion collisions at CERN', and the volume in preparation was subtitled ‘Quark–gluon plasma discovery at CERN’.  In the foreword of the first volume, former director-general of CERN, Herwig Schopper, states that the book fulfils two purposes which have been neglected for a long time.  Primarily a festschrift (an 'honorary book'), it "...delivers the proper credit to physicist Rolf Hagedorn for his important role at the birth of a new research field"; and it describes how a development which he started just 50 years ago is "...closely connected to the most recent surprises in the new experimental domain of relativistic heavy ion physics...".

Honours, decorations, awards and distinctions
 Fellow of the American Physical Society (2011)
 Foreign member of the Academia Europaea (2021)
 Honorary member of the Hungarian Academy of Sciences (2022)

Private life
Rafelski was born in Krakow, Poland, on May 19, 1950. In 1973 Rafelski married Helga Betz; their union produced two children. Dr. Helga Rafelski died of cancer in 2000. In 2003 Rafelski married the American novelist Victoria Grossack.

Bibliography

2020: Spezielle Relativitätstheorie heute.
2016: Melting Hadrons, Boiling Quarks - From Hagedorn Temperature to Ultra-Relativistic Heavy-Ion Collisions at CERN. 
2017: Relativity Matters: From Einstein's EMC2 to Laser Particle Acceleration and Quark–Gluon Plasma.
2002: Hadrons and Quark–Gluon Plasma.
1996: Die Struktur des Vakuums. Ein Dialog über das 'Nichts'.
1992: Spezielle Relativitätstheorie.
1985: Quantum Electrodynamics of Strong Fields.

References

External links
 Johann Rafelski's website
 Scientific publications of Johann Rafelski on INSPIRE-HEP
 

21st-century American physicists
20th-century American physicists
People associated with CERN
20th-century  German physicists
20th-century Polish physicists
Scientists from Kraków
University of Arizona faculty
Academic staff of the Ludwig Maximilian University of Munich
Goethe University Frankfurt alumni
Academic staff of Goethe University Frankfurt
Academic staff of the University of Cape Town
Academic staff of Paris Diderot University
Academic staff of École Polytechnique
Fellows of the American Physical Society
1950 births
Living people
Theoretical physicists
Members of the Hungarian Academy of Sciences